Rock Werchter is an annual music festival held in the village of Werchter, near Leuven, Belgium, since 1976 and is a large sized rock music festival. The 2003, 2005, 2006, 2007, 2012 and 2014 festivals received the Arthur award for best festival in the world at the International Live Music Conference (ILMC). It can host 88,000 guests daily, of which 67,500 combine all four days, to add up to a total maximum of 149,500 different attendees.

The festival started in 1974 as a one-day event with performances from Banzai and Kandahar, but over the years it has evolved to become one of Belgium's largest music festivals. Originally it was a double-festival, called "Torhout-Werchter", with two festival areas at different sites in Belgium: one in Werchter and one in Torhout. In 1999, the festival dropped the Torhout site and since then has taken place only in Werchter. Since 2003 Werchter has been a 4-day festival, as it was sold by owner Herman Schueremans to American organizers Live Nation. Schueremans however remains the main organizer of the event. The festival is organized every first weekend of the summer vacation in Belgium (last weekend of June or the first of July).

In recent years, there has been controversy about rising ticket prices. Because of this, Schueremans was heckled during an appearance on HUMO's Pop Poll, a Belgian alternative award show. At €200 for four days (€18 extra to include camping or €25 for xl-camping) in 2012, it was still considered a relatively inexpensive music festival.

The camping sites officially open at 8am on the first day of the festival, but because of guests arriving early and camping on the street, the organizers have traditionally been forced to open the camping sites early - sometimes more than 24 hours. The campsites are located along the three main entrance roads into Werchter (from Haacht, Aarschot and Leuven), most of them within one  kilometer of the festival site, but some located as far as 3 kilometers away.  In 2011, for the first time, XL camping tickets are available, allowing festival goers to arrive and camp from 4pm on the Wednesday before the festival.

Until the 1990s, the festival attracted mostly Flemish festival goers, but in recent years it has become more and more international with an especially large influx of Dutch, French, Walloon and British visitors, with notable Australian, South African and other contingents. Belgians alternatively go to the Pukkelpop and Dour festivals.

All graphics of Rock Werchter, inclusive the posters, were designed by Tom Hautekiet, who died in April 2020.

History

The festival started off as a one-day event, then named "Torhout-Werchter" festival, becoming a two-day festival in 1996, a 3-day festival in 2000, and a 4-day festival named "Rock Werchter" since 2003.

Before 1995, when the festival was still a double-festival, it had one stage with 8 or 9 bands performing twice, once in Torhout and once in Werchter. Since 1995 the Main stage was accompanied by a second stage. This stage was an open-air stage until 1999 when it was made a tent named 'Pyramid Marquee', with a capacity of 6,000 people. The performers in Pyramid Marquee are usually lesser-known or aimed at a specific audience. Sometimes groups that do well in Pyramid Marquee are expected to have a hard time taking the step to the Main stage, especially when they are seen as an act needing intimate, smaller venues. Sigur Rós is the most famous example of this, when they were programmed on Main Stage in 2008 after their 2006 performance in Pyramid Marquee, but they managed the transition and were hailed as one of the best performances of the festival.

In 2012, a new third stage was added, called "The Barn" which is translated to "De Schuur" in Dutch, a reference to the nickname of organiser Herman Schueremans. The new tent – with a capacity of 10,000 – is meant for the more intimate concerts on Rock Werchter, like Beirut in 2012.

In 2013, Pyramid Marquee was replaced by a new bigger tent, named "KluB C".

The bands presented at Rock Werchter are traditionally a balanced mix of well known artists, popular crowd-pleasing acts and local Belgian acts. Belgian band Deus in 2008 was the first local band to close the Main Stage on the last day for several years. The days usually start around noon and end around 1am. At the end of the last day there is a big fireworks show.

Satellite festivals

TW Classic
Since 2002, the organizers created TW Classic as a tribute to the early days of Rock Werchter. TW Classic ('TW', as in Torhout-Werchter, is the traditional abbreviation of the festival) is a one day/one stage festival held one week after the main event. It usually programs veteran acts like Bruce Springsteen, Phil Collins, The Police, Depeche Mode or Simple Minds, supplemented with younger mainstream Belgian acts. In 2014, The Rolling Stones headlined TW Classic as one of their few festival concerts of 2014. In 2015, Robbie Williams headlined with his Let Me Entertain You Tour, and in 2016 Bruce Springsteen returned to the stage.

Werchter Boutique
This new festival was created in 2008 and organised one week after the main festival. It mainly aims at complete families with acts for children, teenagers as well as adults. The main acts in 2008 were Tokio Hotel, Santana and Doe Maar. In 2009 was centered on a concert of Madonna during her Sticky & Sweet Tour. In all, 68,000 tickets were sold for the concert, making it a one-day sell-out event. In 2010 Prince made one of his only 3 stops in Europe as the headliner. In 2012, it was headlined by metal band Metallica, supported by various heavy metal and rock bands like Gojira, Mastodon and Soundgarden. Muse performed there during their 2013 Unsustainable Tour, with Belgian bands Balthazar and SX as support. In 2016, Rihanna was planned to headline the event, but a shortage of police forces on the planned day because of the Belgian national holiday led to the 2016 event being cancelled, with Rihanna rescheduled to appear a month later at Pukkelpop.

Main Square Festival

Since 2008, the organizers created a small version of Rock Werchter on the central square of Arras, in northern France. It is held on the same dates as Rock Werchter, with a similar line-up - which is an advantage for organisers as they can offer artists two shows instead of one. Arras was chosen as a location because of its large historic central square and because of the lack of big rock festivals in France.

Festival by year

See also

List of historic rock festivals

External links

References

 
Rock festivals in Belgium
Music festivals established in 1974
Summer events in Belgium